Zabłędza  is a village in the administrative district of Gmina Tuchów, within Tarnów County, Lesser Poland Voivodeship, in southern Poland.

The village has an approximate population of 834.

References

Villages in Tarnów County